The Thing Around Your Neck is a short-story collection by Nigerian author Chimamanda Ngozi Adichie, first published in April 2009 by Fourth Estate in the UK and by Knopf in the US.  It received many positive reviews, including:
"She makes storytelling seem as easy as birdsong" (Daily Telegraph);
"Stunning. Like all fine storytellers, she leaves us wanting more" (The Times).

Contents 
 "Cell One" (first published in The New Yorker); in which a spoilt brother and son of a professor is sent to a Nigerian prison and ends up in the infamous Cell One.
 "Imitation" (first published in Other Voices) is set in Philadelphia and concerns Nkem, a young mother whose art-dealer husband visits only two months a year. She finds out that his lover has moved into their Lagos home.
 "A Private Experience" (first published in Virginia Quarterly Review), in which two women caught up in a riot between Christians and Muslims take refuge in an abandoned shop. This story highlighted the friendliness and peace between two women with different religions. It is told in a third person's narrative so that the readers are put in an omniscient position to understand this idea.
 "Ghosts" (first published in Zoetrope: All-Story), in which a retired university professor looks back on his life.
 "On Monday of Last Week" (first published in Granta 98: The Deep End), in which Kamara, a Nigerian woman who has joined her husband in America takes a job as a nanny to an upper-class family and becomes obsessed with the mother.
 "Jumping Monkey Hill" (first published in Granta 95: Loved Ones) is the most autobiographical story. It is set in Cape Town at a writers' retreat where authors from all over Africa gather, and tells of the conflicts experienced by the young Nigerian narrator.
 "The Thing Around Your Neck" (first published in Prospect 99) a woman named Akunna gains a sought-after American visa and goes to live with her uncle; but he molests her and she ends up working as a waitress in Connecticut. She ends up meeting a man whom she falls in love with, but along the way experiences cultural difficulties with him.
 "The American Embassy" (first published in PRISM international), in which a woman applies for asylum but ends up walking away, unwilling to describe her son's murder for the sake of a visa.
 "The Shivering", set on the campus of Princeton University it concerns a Catholic Nigerian woman whose boyfriend has left her, finding solace in the earnest prayers of a stranger who knocks at her door.
 "The Arrangers of Marriage" (first published as "New Husband" in Iowa Review), in which a newly married wife arrives in New York City with her husband; and finds she is unable to accept his rejection of their Nigerian identity.
 "Tomorrow Is Too Far" (first published in Prospect 118) a young woman reveals the devastating secret of her brother's death.
 "The Headstrong Historian" (first published in The New Yorker) covers the life-story of a woman called Nwangba, who believes her husband was killed by his cousins and is determined to regain the inheritance for her son through his education by missionaries. Though her son didn't realise what she hoped, her granddaughter managed to retrieve it, highlighting the significance of holding one's past and one's origin in order to thrive in the future.

Theme

Feminist analyses of Chimamanda Ngozi Adichie's "The Headstrong Historian" read the short story as a revisioning of Chinua Achebe's 1958 novel Things Fall Apart, offering a feminist perspective on the Southern Nigerian Igbo community and its experience with Western colonialism. Chikwenye Okonjo Ogunyemi criticises Nigerian literature for its exclusion of women. Adichie's contemporary Elleke Boehmer commends "The Headstrong Historian" for its feminist agenda, which is identified as extending Achebe's Things Fall Apart and challenging its account of Igbo history.

Contemporary feminist scholar Anene Ejikeme notes that, since its publication in Western publishing outlets, Things Fall Apart has been celebrated as the authentic account of the late nineteenth-century Igbo experience during the colonial era. Neil ten Kortenaar defines Achebe as a ‘historian of Igboland’. While this has been argued, Achebe maintains that "the world's stories should be told from many different perspectives". Ejikeme says that Adichie "forces us to acknowledge that there is not a "single story"of the Igbo past" by revising Achebe's account and claiming a space for Igbo women. "The Danger of a Single Story" is one of Adichie's TED Talks. 

Adichie says that "The Headstrong Historian" was written in an effort to "imagine the life of [her] great-grandmother" after first reading Things Fall Apart, which she saw as a representation of her "great-grandfather’s life". In response to this gendered revisioning, Anene Ejikeme says that while ""The Headstrong Historian" writes with Achebe's canonical work, to say that "The Headstrong Historian" completes Things Fall Apart is to foreclose the possibility of Africans telling multiple stories about the Igbo past". While Ejikeme argues that Adichie challenges Achebe’s canonical authority, Brian Doherty maintains that Adichie's feminising of the Igbo colonial experience is not exclusively critical. Doherty says that Adichie’s feminist revision does not reimagine misrepresented perspectives in Achebe's text, but underrepresented perspectives, which acts as "a corrective lens to a venerated elder's myopic vision" of Igbo history.

Kamene Okonjo presents a feminist reading of ‘The Headstrong Historian,’ which says that Adichie establishes the historicity of her narrative by invoking Achebe’s colonial context and representing the Igbo dual-sex system. In Women in Africa, Okonjo details how dual-sex systems in pre-colonial Igboland gave women greater authority than the Western single-sex system. Research works by Nkiru Nzegwu and Ifi Amadiume also discuss Igbo women’s collective agency. In "The Headstrong Historian", Nwamgba receives support from the Women's Council when her late husband's cousins steal his property and, as a result, several women "sit on" the cousins. One criticism of Achebe's Things Fall Apart focuses on the representation of women as powerless in the Igbo tribal system, beyond conducting marriage ceremonies. Judith Van Allen notes that early ethnographic studies of Igbo communities comment on the 1929 Women's War in southeastern Nigeria, a protest that saw Igbo women challenge the policies of the colonial government. Rhonda Cobham's feminist reading says that while Achebe mentions the Women's Council, he does not establish its civic agency, which saw women intervene in community disputes by "sitting on" men, thereby publicly shaming them. Cobhman says that Adichie locates Nwamgba's protests to the Women's Council in a historical context that counters Achebe's representation of oppressed Igbo women. 

In her youth, Nwamgba defeats her brother in a wrestling match. This is considered by Daria Tunca to be an inversion of Okonkwo’s masculinity, which was earned as a result of his own wrestling victory. Tunca says that Adichie further remaps the ideal of masculinity in Things Fall Apart by presenting Obierika as a flute player, which is described in Achebe's text as an "unmanly" characteristic. Tunca also says that Achebe's Okonkwo is placed in the margins of Adichie's narrative: his name is mentioned twice, both in reference to his daughter. Conversely, Tunca also maintains that although Nwamgba "wrestled her brother to the ground", her father warns "everyone not to let the news leave the compound", in compliance with normative gender hierarchies. 

Adichie comments on the marginalisation of women in Things Fall Apart, stating that it is "impossible, especially for the contemporary reader, not to be struck by the portrayal of gender in Things Fall Apart, and the equating of weakness and inability with femaleness". Adichie also defends the text and identifies Achebe's depiction of Okonkwo's headstrong daughter as an interrogation of the patriarchy. Susan Z. Andrade identifies Adichie as writing with Achebe, but from a gendered angle: Andrade notes that "The Headstrong Historian" tells the same historical narrative, detailing Igbo life through the protagonist's perspective and Igboland's experience under colonial rule. However, within this same cultural context, a different story is told; Adichie's account brings a woman from the periphery of Achebe's text into the centre.

The chronology of "The Headstrong Historian" extends beyond Nwamgba's death and imagines the future of a third-generation Igbo woman. On her deathbed, Nwamgba is visited by her granddaughter Grace. At Nwangba's bedside, Grace puts "down her schoolbag, inside of which was her textbook with a chapter called "The Pacification of the Primitive Tribes of Southern Nigeria", by an administrator from Worcestershire who had lived among them". Susan VanZanten identifies this as a direct intertextual allusion to Achebe's Things Fall Apart, which sees the local District Commissioner contemplate narrating Okonkwo's life in a chapter of his book on The Pacification of the Primitive Tribes of the Lower Niger. VanZanten says that this single chapter recalls the District Commissioner's reductive view of Africa. VanZanten considers this notion subverted in "The Headstrong Historian", in which it is the coloniser's book that has become a single chapter in Grace's textbook. Decades later, Grace becomes a historian herself and publishes a book called Pacifying with Bullets: A Reclaimed History of Southern Nigeria. Tunca says that Grace, and by extension Adichie, revises a Nigerian history as imagined by Western writers: the indefinite article in A Reclaimed History "suggests that her vision is only one among others". Tunca's analysis says that Grace acknowledges what Adichie herself refers to in her 2009 TED talk, "the danger of a single story" in representing the history of an entire people. 

In her Ted Talk, Adichie details how a reader believed that the abusive father in Purple Hibiscus represented all African men: Adichie notes that "The single story creates stereotypes. And the problem with stereotypes is not that they are untrue, but that they are incomplete. They make one story become the only story".  The future Grace teaches at an Igbo school and delivers seminars on southern Nigerian history after learning about a Western-educated Nigerian historian who resigned upon hearing that African history was to be added to the university syllabus. In later years, Grace returns to Nigeria and changes her name to Afamefuna, the Igbo name that Nwamgba had given her, meaning "My Name Will Not Be Lost". Michael L. Ross says that this revisionary gesture allows Grace to remap and retrieve her communal Igbo identity. Daria Tunca and Bénédicte Ledent say that, as third generation Igbo historians, both Grace and Adichie supplement Achebe's historical account of Igbo history by highlighting "the danger of a single story" and providing a more authentically recorded womanist perspective of Igbo past.

Bibliography

Achebe, Chinua, Chinua Achebe, The African Trilogy: Things Fall Apart, No Longer at Ease, Arrow of God(New York: Knopf, 2010) 
Adewale, Toyin and Omowunmi Segun, eds, Breaking the Silence(Lagos: WRITA, 1996) 
Adichie, Chimamanda Ngozi, Half a Yellow Sun(New York: Knopf, 2005) 
Adichie, Chimamanda Ngozi, The Headstrong Historian(2009) https://www.newyorker.com/magazine/2008/06/23/the-headstrong-historian [accessed 21 January 2021]
Adichie, Chimamanda Ngozi, "Achebe at 82: We Remember Differently", Premium Times, Nigeria(2012) https://www.premiumtimesng.com/entertainment/108378-chinua-achebe-at-82-we-remember-differently-by-chimamanda-ngozi-adichie.html [accessed 20 January 2021] 
Adichie, Chimamanda Ngozi, "African "Authenticity" and the Biafran Experience", Transition, 99 (2008) 42–53, JSTOR 20204260
Adichie, Chimamanda Ngozi, Chimamanda Ngozi Adichie Interview by Anna North: "When You're Not a White Male Writing About White Male Things Then Somehow Your Work Has to Mean Something", Salon (2014) . [accessed 20 January 2021]
Adichie, Chimamanda Ngozi, "The Danger of a Single Story", TED Talks (2009) https://www.ted.com/talks/chimamanda_ngozi_adichie_the_danger_of_a_single_story [accessed 21 January 2021].
Adichie, Chimamanda Ngozi, The Thing Around Your Neck (New York: Knopf, 2009) 
Adichie, Chimamanda Ngozi, "We Should All Be Feminists", TED Talks, (2012) https://www.ted.com/talks/chimamanda_ngozi_adichie_we_should_all_be_feminists?language=en [accessed 20 January 2021]
Amadiume, Ifi, Male Daughters, Female Husbands (London: Zed Press, 1987)  
Andrade, Susan Z, The Nation Writ Small: African Fictions and Feminisms, 1958–1988 (Durham, North Carolina: Duke University Press, 2011)  
Andrade, Susan Z., "Adichie's Genealogies: National and Feminine Novels", Research in African Literatures: Achebe's World: African Literature at Ffty, 42.2 (2011), 91-101, JSTOR 42.2.91
Andrade, Susan Z., "Rioting Women, Writing Women: Gender, Nationalism and the Public Sphere in Africa", Africa after Gender, ed. by Catherine Cole, Takyiwaa Manuh, and Stephan Miescher (Bloomington: Indiana University Press, 2007), pp. 85–107.  
Andrade, Susan Z., "The Joys of Daughterhood: Gender, Nationalism and the Making of Literary Tradition(s)", Cultural Institutions of the Novel, ed. by Deidre Lynch and William B. Warner (Durham, North Carolina: Duke University Press, 1996) pp. 249–75.  
Boehmer, Elleke, "Achebe and His Influence in Some Contemporary African Writing", Interventions, 11:2 (2009), 141-153. doi:10.1080/13698010903052982
Brooks, Jerome, "Chinua Achebe Interview", The Paris Review, 133 (1994)
Bryce, Jane, "Half and Half Children: Third-Generation Women Writers and the New Nigerian Novel", Research in African Literatures, 39.2 (2008), 49–67, JSTOR 20109578
Carby, Hazel, Reconstructing Womanhood: The Emergence of the Afro-American Woman Novelist (Oxford: Oxford University Press, 1989)  
Chukwuma, Helen, ed., Achebe’s Women: Imagism and Power (Trenton: Africa World Press, 2012)  
Cobham, Rhonda, "Making Men and History: Achebe and the Politics of Revisionism in Things Fall Apart", Approaches to Teaching Achebe’s Things Fall Apart, ed. By Bernth Lindfors (New York: MLA, 1991), pp. 91-100.  
Cobham, Rhonda, "Problems of Gender and History in the Teaching of Things Fall Apart", Things Fall Apart: A Norton Critical Edition, ed. by Francis Abiola Irele (New York: W.W. Norton, 2009), pp.510-21.  
Cooper, Brenda, A New Generation of African Writers: Migration, Material Culture and Language (London: James Currey, 2008)  
Davies, Carole Boyce, "Motherhood in the Works of Male and Female Igbo Writers: Achebe, Emecheta, Nwapa and Nzekwu", Ngambika: Studies of Women in African Literature, ed. by Carole Boyce Davies and Anne Adams Graves (Trenton: Africa World, 1986)  
Davies, Carole Boyce, Black Women, Writing, and Identity: Migrations of the Subject (New York: Routledge, 1994)  
Davies, Carole Boyce, "Migration, African Writing and the Post-Colonial/Diasporic Chimamanda Adichie Moment", Gender and Race Matter: Global Perspectives on Being a Woman, ed. by Marcia Texler Segal and Vasilikie Demos (Somerville, MA: Emerald Group Publishing, 2016), pp.233-248.  
Doherty, Brian, "Writing Back with a Difference: Chimamanda Ngozi Adichie's "The Headstrong Historian" as a Response to Chinua Achebe's Things Fall Apart", Tradition and Change in Contemporary West and East African Fiction, ed. by Ogaga Okuyade (Amsterdam and New York: Rodopi, 2014), pp.187-201.  
Eisenberg, Eve. ""Real Africa" / "Which Africa?": The Critique of Mimetic Realism in Chimamanda Ngozi Adichie's Short Fiction", Writing Africa in the Short Story, ed. by E. Emenyonu (Woodbridge, Suffolk: Boydell & Brewer, 2013), pp.8-24.  
Ejikeme, Anene, "The Women of Things Fall Apart, Speaking from a Different Perspective: Chimamanda Adichie's Headstrong Storytelling", Meridians, 15.2 (2017), 307-29, JSTOR 15.2.02
Emecheta, Buchi, "Feminism with a small "f"!', Criticism and Ideology: Second African Writer's Conference, ed. by Kirsten Holst Peterson (Uppsala: Scandinavian Institute of African Studies, 1988), pp. 173-185.  
Emejulu, Akwugo, and Francesca Sobande, To Exist is to Resist: Black Feminism in Europe (London: Pluto Press, 2019)  
Harrow, Kenneth W, Less Than One and Double: A Feminist Reading of African Women's Writing (Portsmouth, NH: Heinemann, 2002)  
Hewett, Heather, "Coming of Age: Chimamanda Ngozi Adichie and the voice of the Third Generation", New Nigerian Writing, 32.1 (2005), 73–97, JSTOR 40239030
Irele, F. Abiola, The African Imagination: Literature in Africa and the Black Diaspora (Oxford: Oxford University Press, 2001) 
Isichei, Elizabeth, History of the Igbo People (London: Macmillan, 1975)  
Jeyifo, Biodun, "Okonkwo and His Mother: Things Fall Apart and Issues of Gender in the Constitution of Postcolonial Discourse", Callaloo, 16.4 (1993), 847-58, JSTOR 2932213
Lascelles, Amber, "Locating black feminist resistance through diaspora and post-diaspora in Edwidge Danticat's and Chimamanda Ngozi Adichie's short stories", African and Black Diaspora: An International Journal, 13:2 (2020), 227-240. doi:10.1080/17528631.2020.1750176
Mikailu, David, and Brendan Wattenberg, "My Name Will Not Be Lost: Cosmopolitan Temporality and Reclaimed History in Chimamanda Ngozi Adichie's "The Headstrong Historian"", African Studies Quarterly, 15.4 (2015), 45-58. doi:2152-2448
Miles, Angela, "North American Feminisms / Global Feminisms: Contradictory or Complementary?", Sisterhood, Feminisms, and Power: From Africa to the Diaspora, ed. by Obioma Nnaemeka (Trenton, NJ: Africa World Press, 1998) pp.163-82.  
Mohanty, Chandra T., Feminism without Borders: Decolonizing Theory and Practicing Solidarity (Durham: Duke University Press, 2003)  
Mustich, James, "Chimamanda Ngozi Adichie: A Conversation", Barnes and Noble Review (2009) https://www.barnesandnoble.com/review/chimamanda-ngozi-adichie [accessed 21 November 2021]
Nnaemeka, Obioma, "Feminism, Rebellious Women and Cultural Boundaries: Rereading Flora Nwapa and Her Compatriots", Research in African Literatures, 26.2 (1995), JSTOR 3820273
Nzegwu, Nkiru, Family Matters: Feminist Concepts in African Philosophy of Culture (Albany, NY: SUNY Press, 2006)  
Nzegwu, Nkiru, "Hidden Spaces, Silenced Practices and the Concept of Igba N'rira", West Africa Review, 3.2 (2002) doi:1525-4488
Durosimi Jones, Eldred, Eustace Palmer, and Marjorie Jones, eds, African Literature Today: Women in African Literature, vol.15 (London: James Curry, 2003)  
Ogunyemi, Chikwenye Okonjo, Africa Wo/man Palava: The Nigerian Novel by Women (Chicago: University of Chicago Press, 1996)  
Ogunyemi, Chikwenye Okonjo, "Women and Nigerian Literature", Perspectives on Nigerian Literature: 1700 to the Present, ed. by Yami Ogunbiyi (Lagos: Guardian Books Nigeria Limited, 1988), pp.60-67 
Ogwude, Sophia O., "History and Ideology in Chimamanda Adichie's Fiction", Tydskrif Vir Letterkunde, 48.1 (2011), 110-123. doi:10.4314/tvl.v48i1.63824
Okonjo, Kamene, "The Dual-Sex Political System in Operation: Igbo Women and Community Politics in Midwestern Nigeria", Women in Africa: Studies in Social and Economic Change, ed. by Nancy Hafkin and Edna G. Bay (Stanford: Stanford University Press, 1976), pp.45-58.  
Powell, Andrea, "Problematizing Polygyny in the Historical Novels of Chinua Achebe: The Role of the Western Feminist Scholar", Research in African Literatures, 39.1 (2008), 166–84, JSTOR 20109565
Ross, Michael L., "Ownership of Language: Diglossia in the Fiction of Chimamanda Ngozi Adichie", Research in African Literatures, 50.1 (2019), 111-26, JSTOR 50.1.07
Ryan, Connor, "Defining Diaspora in the Words of Women Writers: A Feminist Reading of Chimamanda Adichie's "The Thing Around Your Neck" and Dionne Brand's "At the Full and Change of the Moon", Callaloo, 37.5 (2014), 1230-1244, JSTOR 24265203
Silva, Meyre Ivone da, "African Feminists Towards the Politics of Empowerment", Revistra de Letras, 44.2 (2004), 129–38, JSTOR 27666802
Sreedharan, Amodini, "Chimamanda N. Adichie's Dear Ijeawele: A Powerful Programming of Feminist Mothering", Writers Editors Critics, 8.1 (2018), pp.49-56. doi:2231-198X
Strehle, Susan, "Producing Exile: Diasporic Vision in Adichie's Half of a Yellow Sun", Modern Fiction Studies, 57.4 (2011), 650–72, JSTOR 26287223
Sullivan, Joanna, "The Question of a National Literature for Nigeria," Research in African Literatures, 32.3 (2001), 71–85, JSTOR 3820425
ten Kortenaar, Neil, "How the Center is Made to Hold in Things Fall Apart," Chinua Achebe's Things Fall Apart: A Casebook, ed. By Isidore Okpewho (New York: Oxford University Press, 2003), pp.123-45.  
Tunca, Daria, and Bénédicte Ledent, "The Power of a Singular Story: Narrating Africa and Its Diasporas," Research in African Literatures, 46.4 (2015), 1-9, JSTOR 10.2979
Tunca, Daria, "Appropriating Achebe: Chimamanda Ngozi Adichie's Purple Hibiscus and "The Headstrong Historian"", Adaptation and Cultural Appropriation: Literature, Film, and the Arts, ed. by Pascal Nicklas and Oliver Lindner (Berlin: De Gruyter, 2012), pp.230-250.  
Tunca, Daria, "Chimamanda Ngozi Adichie as Chinua Achebe's (Unruly) Literary Daughter: The Past Present, and Future of "Adichebean" Criticism," Research in African Literatures, 49.4 (2018), 107-26, JSTOR 10.2979
Van Allen, Judith, ""Aba Riots" or Igbo "Women's War"? Ideology, Stratification, and the Invisibility of Women", Women in Africa: Studies in Social and Economic Change, ed. by Nancy Hafkin and Edna G. Bay (Stanford: Stanford University Press, 1976)  
VanZanten, Susan, ‘A Conversation with Chimamanda Ngozi Adichie,’ Image, 65 (2010), 86-99, JSTOR 206-281-2988
VanZanten, Susan, ""The Headstrong Historian": Writing with Things Fall Apart", Research in African Literatures, 46.2 (2015), 85-103, JSTOR 10.2979
Wenske, Ruth S, "Adichie in Dialogue with Achebe: Balancing Dualities in Half of a Yellow Sun", Research in African Literatures, 47.3 (2016), 70–87, JSTOR 47.3.05

References

External links
"Cell One"  online text
"A Private Experience" online text
"The Headstrong Historian" online text
Short, sweet, with a twist: Chimamanda Ngozi Adichie talks stories to Kate Mosse
How Do You Write a Love Story With Teeth? A conversation with novelist Chimamanda Ngozi Adichie

Reviews
 Jane Shilling, "The Thing Around Your Neck by Chimamanda Ngozi Adichie: Review", Daily Telegraph, 2 April 2009
 Review from TimesOnline
 Jess Row, "African/American", The New York Times, 27 August 2009
 Aminatta Forna, "Endurance tests", The Guardian, 16 May 2009

2009 short story collections
Short story collections by Chimamanda Ngozi Adichie
Alfred A. Knopf books
Fourth Estate books
Nigerian short story collections